is a traditional Okinawan martial arts weapon consisting of two sticks (traditionally made of wood), connected to each other at their ends by a short metal chain or a rope. It is approximately 30 cm (12") (sticks) and 1 inch (rope). A person who has practiced using this weapon is referred to in Japanese as nunchakuka.

The nunchaku is most widely used in martial arts such as Okinawan kobudō and karate. It is intended to be used as a training weapon, since practicing with it enables the development of quick hand movements and improves posture. Modern nunchaku may be made of metal, plastic or fiberglass instead of the traditional wood. Toy versions and replicas not intended to be used as weapons may be made of polystyrene foam or plastic. Possession of this weapon is illegal in some countries, except for use in professional martial arts schools.

The origin of the nunchaku is unclear; a traditional explanation holds that it was originally used by Okinawan farmers as a flail for threshing rice. Another weapon, called the tabak-toyok, native to the northern Philippines, is constructed very similarly, suggesting that it and the nunchaku descended from the same instrument.

In modern times, the nunchaku (Tabak-Toyok) was popularized by the actor and martial artist Bruce Lee and by Dan Inosanto. Lee famously used nunchaku in several scenes in the 1972 film Fist of Fury. When Tadashi Yamashita worked with Bruce Lee on the 1973 film Enter the Dragon, he enabled Lee to further explore the use of the nunchaku and other kobudo disciplines. The nunchaku is also the signature weapon of the cartoon character Michelangelo in the Teenage Mutant Ninja Turtles franchise.

In addition the nunchaku is used in certain contact sports.

Etymology 

The origin of the word nunchaku is not known. Another name for this weapon is "nūchiku"().

In the English language, nunchaku are often referred to as "nunchuks". It is a variant of a word from the Okinawan language, which itself may come from a Taiwanese word for a farming tool, neng-cak.

Origins 

The origin of the nunchaku is unclear, although one popular belief is that nunchaku was originally a short South-East Asian flail.  A near identical weapon to the nunchaku called tabak-toyok exists in the northern Philippines, which was used to thresh rice or soybeans. Alternative theories are that it was originally developed from an Okinawan horse bit (muge) or from a wooden clapper called hyoshiki carried by the village night watch, made of two blocks of wood joined by a cord. The night watch would hit the blocks of wood together to attract people's attention, then warn them about fires and other dangers.

An oft-repeated claim is that the nunchaku and other Okinawan weapons were tools adapted for use as weapons by peasants who were forbidden from possessing conventionial weapons, but available academic sources suggest this is likely a romantic exaggeration created by 20th century martial arts schools.  Martial arts in Okinawa were practiced exclusively by the aristocracy (kazoku) and "serving nobles" (shizoku), but were prohibited among commoners (heimin).

Parts 

Ana: the hole on the kontoh of each handle for the himo to pass through—only nunchaku that are connected by himo have an ana.
Himo: the rope which connects the two handles of some nunchaku.
Kusari: the chain which connects the two handles of some nunchaku.
Kontoh: the top of each handle.
Jukon-bu: the upper area of the handle.
Chukon-bu: the center part of the handle.
Kikon-bu: the lower part of the handle.
Kontei: the bottom of the handle.

Construction 

Nunchaku consist of two sections of wood connected by a cord or chain, though variants may include additional sections of wood and chain. In China, the striking stick is called "dragon stick" ("龍棍"), while the handle is called "yang stick" ("陽棍"). 

The rounded nunchaku is comparatively heavy and used for training, whereas the octagonal nunchaku is used for combat. Ideally, each piece should be long enough to protect the forearm when held in a high grip near the top of the shaft. Both ends are usually of equal length, although asymmetrical nunchaku exist that are closer to a traditional flail.

The ideal length of the connecting rope or chain is just long enough to allow the user to lay it over his or her palm, with the sticks hanging comfortably and perpendicular to the ground. The weapon should be properly balanced in terms of weight. Cheaper or gimmicky nunchaku (such as glow-in-the-dark versions) are often not properly balanced, which prevents the performer from performing the more advanced and flashier "low-grip" moves, such as overhand twirls. The weight should be balanced towards the outer edges of the sticks for maximum ease and control of the swing arcs.

Traditional nunchaku are made from a strong, flexible hardwood such as oak, loquat or pasania.

Formal styles 
The nunchaku is most commonly used in Okinawan kobudō and karate, but it is also used in Korean hapkido and eskrima. (More accurately, the Tabak-Toyok, a similar though distinct Philippine weapon, is used, not the Okinawan nunchaku). Its application is different in each style. The traditional Okinawan forms use the sticks primarily to grip and lock. Filipino martial artists use it much the same way they would wield a stick: striking is given precedence. Korean systems combine offensive and defensive moves, so both locks and strikes are taught. Other proprietary systems of Nunchaku are also used in Sembkalah (Iranian Monolingual Combat Style), which makes lethal blows in defense and assault.

Nunchaku is often the first weapon wielded by a student, to teach self-restraint and posture, as the weapon is liable to hit the wielder more than the opponent if not used properly.

The Nunchaku is usually wielded in one hand, but it can also be dual wielded. It can be whirled around, using its hardened handles for blunt force, as well as wrapping its chain around an attacking weapon to immobilize or disarm an opponent. Nunchaku training has been noted to increase hand speed, improve posture, and condition the hands of the practitioner. Therefore, it makes a useful training weapon.

Freestyle
Freestyle nunchaku is a modern style of performance art using nunchaku as a visual tool, rather than as a weapon. With the growing prevalence of the Internet, the availability of nunchaku has greatly increased. In combination with the popularity of other video sharing sites, many people have become interested in learning how to use the weapons for freestyle displays. Freestyle is one discipline of competition held by the World Nunchaku Association. Some modern martial arts teach the use of nunchaku, as it may help students improve their reflexes, hand control, and other skills.

Legality 
In a number of countries, possession of nunchaku is illegal, or the nunchaku is defined as a regulated weapon.  These bans largely came after the wave of popularity of Bruce Lee films. Norway, Canada, Russia, Poland, Chile, and Spain are all known to have significant restrictions.

In Germany, nunchaku have been illegal since April 2006, when they were declared a strangling weapon.

In England and Wales, public possession of nunchaku is heavily restricted by the Prevention of Crime Act 1953 and the Criminal Justice Act 1988. However, nunchaku are not included in the list of weapons whose sale and manufacture is prohibited by Schedule 1 of the Criminal Justice Act 1988 (Offensive Weapons) Order 1988 and are traded openly (subject to age restrictions).

In Scotland, laws restricting offensive weapons are similar to those of England and Wales. However, in a case in 2010, Glasgow Sheriff Court refused to accept a defence submission that nunchaku were not explicitly  prohibited weapons under Scottish law, although the defendants were acquitted on other grounds.

The use of nunchaku was, in the 1990s, censored from UK rebroadcasts of American children's TV shows such as Teenage Mutant Ninja Turtles cartoons and films. The UK version of Teenage Mutant Ninja Turtles needed to be edited, the nunchakus used by Michelangelo were edited, until they were replaced by a grappling hook. The UK version of the Soul Blade video game was also edited, replacing the character Li Long's nunchaku with a three-sectioned staff.

In Hong Kong, it is illegal to possess metal or wooden nunchaku connected by a chain, though one can obtain a license from the police as a martial arts instructor, and rubber nunchaku are still allowed. Possession of nunchaku in mainland China is legal.

Australia varies by state laws. In New South Wales, the weapon is on the restricted weapons list and, thus, can only be owned with a permit.

The United States varies at the state level. As elsewhere, the popularity of Bruce Lee movies in the 1970s led to a wave of nunchaku bans. Many states prohibit carrying nunchaku in public as a concealed weapon, but a small number restrict or completely ban ownership. California has made exceptions for professional martial arts schools and practitioners to use the nunchaku. The state of Arizona previously considered nunchaku to be a "prohibited weapon" since the 1970s, making mere possession illegal, with the sole exception of nunchaku-like objects that are manufactured for use as illumination devices. A constitutional challenge failed as well. It was legalized in 2019. New York formerly banned all possession of nunchaku, but this was ruled unconstitutional in the 2018 case Maloney v. Singas.

Law enforcement use 
Nunchaku have been employed by a few American police departments for decades, especially after the popular Bruce Lee movies of the 1970's. For instance, in 2015, police in the small town of Anderson, California were trained and deployed to use nunchaku as a form of non-lethal force. They were selected because of their utility as both a striking weapon and a control tool.

Orcutt Police Nunchaku (OPN) had been adopted by more than 200 law enforcement agencies in the USA. Even though it could be used as a striking weapon, it was mainly used as a grappling implement on the wrists and ankles for pain compliance. They were very effective in that regard but improper use had been associated with injuries like wrist and limb breaks that led to them being phased out.

However, tasers have become the preferred non-lethal weapon for most departments.

See also 
Arnis
Butterfly sword
Flail (weapon)
Meteor hammer
Sai
Tabak-Toyok
Three-section staff 
Two-section staff

References 

Flail weapons
Japanese martial arts terminology
Weapons of Okinawa